Joe O'Reilly (born 1 April 1955) is an Irish Fine Gael politician who has served as Leas-Chathaoirleach of Seanad Éireann since August 2020. He has served as a Senator for the Labour Panel since April 2016, and previously from 2007 to 2011 for the Industrial and Commercial Panel and from 1989 to 1992 for the Cultural and Educational Panel. He served as a Teachta Dála (TD) for the Cavan–Monaghan constituency from 2011 to 2016.

Early and personal life
Born in Cootehill, County Cavan, he was educated at St Patrick's College, Cavan; St. Aidan's Comprehensive School, Cootehill; University College Dublin; Trinity College Dublin; St Patrick's College, Dublin and the Dublin Institute of Technology. O'Reilly is a primary school teacher by profession.

Political career
In local politics, he was first elected to Cavan County Council in 1985 but lost his seat in 1991. He was re-elected at the 1999 local elections for the Bailieborough local electoral area and again in 2004.

He was a candidate at the 2007 general election for the Cavan–Monaghan constituency. As a result of Fianna Fáil Minister Rory O'Hanlon serving as Ceann Comhairle of Dáil Éireann from 2002 to 2007, he was guaranteed reelection and therefore the seats were reduced from 5 to 4 in the constituency. He finished with a total of 9550 first preference votes, the highest losing vote in the country in that election. He won a seat in the general election in February 2011. He lost this Dáil seat at the 2016 general election.

In European elections, he was an unsuccessful candidate at the 2009 European Parliament election, for the North-West constituency.

As a Senator, he was first elected in 1989 to the 19th Seanad, on the Cultural and Educational Panel. He lost his seat at the 1993 Seanad elections and was unsuccessful again at the 1997 Seanad election. He was elected to the 23rd Seanad in 2007, serving on the Industrial and Commercial Panel and as Fine Gael Seanad Spokesperson on Communications, Energy and Natural Resources. O'Reilly was elected to the Labour Panel of the 25th Seanad in April 2016.

He is the Fine Gael Seanad Spokesperson on Foreign Affairs and Trade.

Political views
In 2017, Fine Gael announced that they were planning a bill to allow pubs to open on Good Friday, reversing a 90-year-old ban. O'Reilly went against his party's view and said that the tradition was "part of our national identity".

References

External links

Joe O'Reilly's page on the Fine Gael website

	

1955 births
Living people
Alumni of University College Dublin
Alumni of Trinity College Dublin
Alumni of St Patrick's College, Dublin
Alumni of Dublin Institute of Technology
Fine Gael TDs
Irish schoolteachers
Local councillors in County Cavan
Members of the 19th Seanad
Members of the 23rd Seanad
Members of the 25th Seanad
Members of the 26th Seanad
Members of the 31st Dáil
Fine Gael senators
People educated at St Patrick's College, Cavan